Pokémon: Lucario and the Mystery of Mew, originally released in Japan as Pocket Monsters Advanced Generation the Movie: Mew and the Wave Hero, is a 2005 Japanese animated fantasy film directed by Kunihiko Yuyama and produced by OLM, Inc. It is the eighth installment of the Pokémon film series. The film stars the voices of Rica Matsumoto, Ikue Ōtani Yūji Ueda, Kaori, Fushigi Yamada, Megumi Hayashibara, Shin-ichiro Miki, Inuko Inuyama, Daisuke Namikawa, Satomi Kōrogi, Takeshi Aono, Noriko Hidaka, Kōichi Yamadera, Kumiko Okae, Momoko Kikuchi, and Becky. It was released in theaters in Japan on July 16, 2005, followed by the Japanese DVD and VHS releases on December 22, 2005.

The English dub was done by 4Kids Entertainment and was first released on DVD in Australia on August 16, 2006, with the US release following on September 19, 2006. The English dub of the movie premiered in the US for the first time at the 2006 Comic-Con in San Diego, California. The film aired in the United Kingdom in July 2007 on Cartoon Network and it continues to air on CITV. This is also the last Pokémon film to be dubbed in English by 4Kids Entertainment, who have been dubbing Pokémon from the start of the television series in 1998.  All future Pokémon episodes and films would be dubbed by The Pokémon Company International. The events of the film take place during the eighth season of the Pokémon series, Pokémon: Advanced Battle.

Pokémon: Lucario and the Mystery of Mew was one of the four nominees for the American Anime Awards' "Best Anime Feature" award, but it lost to Final Fantasy VII: Advent Children.

Plot 
Ash arrives at Cameron Palace where a festival is being held to celebrate Sir Aaron, an ancient hero who averted a war that was about to begin outside of the Tree of Beginning. At the festival, Ash, ironically wearing a duplicate of Aaron's outfit, competes in a tournament at Cameron Palace and wins, to become the "Aura Guardian" for that year. As part of the celebration, Ash is granted Aaron's staff, which contains his Pokémon companion, Lucario, whom Aaron had sealed before stopping the war.

However, when Pikachu fainted while protecting Mew from an adventurer named Kidd attempting to put a tracker on the legendary Pokémon using her pair of Weavile, he was teleported away by Mew. Naturally Ash, with the help of Lucario, who was released from the staff when Ash "assumed the pose" of Sir Aaron, follows Mew to the Tree of Beginning in order to rescue Pikachu. There is but one problem: after being sealed in the staff, Lucario has completely lost his trust for humans which leads to a fight just after the beginning of their quest. While traveling Max gives Lucario a chocolate bar, which he finds he likes and it helps toward him trusting humans. Eventually, Ash earns Lucario's trust by apologizing for his hurtful words and they enter the Tree of Beginning. They are attacked by Regirock, Regice, and Registeel, the tree's guardians who recognize them as a threat.

They enter the tree and are attacked by the tree's defense system, antibody-type mechanisms, triggered by Kidd's survey robots. The antibodies are able to transform into jelly-like representation of Pokémon and then absorb the threat. When Ash and the gang are absorbed into the tree, Mew saves them by reasoning with the tree's defense mechanism. The disruption of energy flow in the tree due to the defense system sends the tree into shock, and as Mew and the tree are symbiotic creatures that depend on each other for survival, Mew also becomes very ill.  In order to save Mew and the tree, Lucario and Ash combine their Aura to reverse the self-destruction of the tree.

Lucario pushes Ash away towards the completion of the process so that Ash won't end up sacrificing himself to the tree as Aaron did (presumably, no matter if it's a human or a Pokemon, giving up all of one's Aura means death for that being). Afterward, a "time flower" shows a memory of Aaron sacrificing himself to stop a war. Right before Aaron died (in the memory), he said how Lucario was his closest friend and would miss him before dying. It is made clear that the reason Aaron sealed Lucario was to ensure that Lucario didn't die with him, Lucario having witnessed this sobs and gives his life so that he can honor his friend. Sadly, it means that Lucario moves on with Aaron into the afterlife. Lucario moves on, without regrets now that he knows he will see Aaron again, as Aaron also did for him. The dramatic ending concludes the story well as all characters move on after learning important lessons of trust, sacrifice, and love, with Ash saying He isn't gone...His aura is with me.

In the credits, Lucario is shown added into a painting of Sir Aaron, showing that the owners of the castle respect his status as a hero, and further on in the credits, you get a short glimpse of Kidd Summers seeming to be helping Butler from the previous movie, Pokémon: Jirachi—Wish Maker. At the end of the credits, Lucario and Sir Aaron appear together eating a chocolate bar, (an endearing kickback to what Max did earlier).

Voice cast

Release

Theatrical run 
Pokémon: Lucario and the Mystery of Mew was released in Japan on July 16, 2005.

Home media 
It was released direct-to-video with an English-language dub in the United States on September 19, 2006 by Viz Video. However, the Australian DVD has the film presented in widescreen while the USA release contained a full-frame presentation. Also, there was a Collector's Edition that was bundled with the episode The Mastermind Of Mirage Pokémon. The film has yet to be released on DVD in the United Kingdom although it has been released as a digital download in the UK iTunes Store and on Amazon's UK website.

Reception

Box office 
The general screening of Lucario and the Mystery of Mew in Japan ran for 6 weeks from July 16 to August 26, 2005.
 July 16–17: 2nd overall, 1st domestic
 July 23–24: 2nd overall, 1st domestic
 July 30–31: 2nd overall, 1st domestic
 August 6–7: 3rd overall, 2nd domestic
 August 13–14: 3rd overall, 2nd domestic
 August 20–21: 4th overall, 2nd domestic
 August 27–28: 7th overall, 4th domestic

Since premiering on July 16, 2005, Lucario and the Mystery of Mew grossed  at the Japanese box office, making it the year's second highest-grossing domestic film, behind only Howl's Moving Castle. Approximately 3,930,000 viewers saw the movie.

The final box office tally is 98.3 percent of the sales of last year, but with the last three movies all consistently passing the 4 billion yen mark, it is considered a market success. The slight market loss is attributed to stiff competition at the box office from other anime films running at the same time. However, the film was critically acclaimed by critics, with praise towards its animation, music score, and its darker tone.

Critical reception 
Carlos Santos, in a review of the film for Anime News Network, gave the film an overall grade of B−. He praised the film for its "epic" premise, saying that it had "enough weight to sustain an hour and a half of action", as well as its animation and use of CGI. However, he criticized the film's overall plot and the music used in the English dub. He concluded: "Lucario and the Mystery of Mew isn't out to change the face of animation forever, but it's set to entertain, which it does with its fantasy flavor and strong back-story. Kids will get to see their favorite characters, while anyone who's babysitting them will get to see a fairly decent adventure." Jeremy Mullin of IGN gave it a positive review, giving it a 7 out of 10 and saying that "this one is especially interesting, packed full of action and intrigue" and that "there's also plenty of comedy, whether it's Brock trying to hit on the nearest pretty lady or recurring villains Team Rocket trying to get a leg up in the action".

Notes

References

External links 

 Official Japanese Movie Page
 
 
 
 
 

2000s adventure films
2000s Japanese-language films
2005 anime films
2005 films
Films directed by Kunihiko Yuyama
Japanese sequel films
Lucario and the Mystery of Mew
Toho animated films
Viz Media anime
Films scored by Shinji Miyazaki
OLM, Inc. animated films